Founded in 1971 as the Mississippi Foundation For Medical Care (MFMC), the Information & Quality Healthcare (IQH) is an independent, Mississippi, not-for-profit corporation. It was established by the House of Delegates at the 103rd Annual Session of the Mississippi State Medical Association. with an incorporation date of July 6, 1971. A grant from the National Center for Health Services Research and Development in 1971 allowed development of a physician-sponsored system for evaluating the quality of medical care. The primary goal was to improve the quality of medical care in the state and produce long lasting and tangible results. Programs such as the Experimental Medical Care Review Organization (EMCRO) and the Professional Standards Review Organization (PSRO) preceded the Peer Review Organization (PRO) designation which came on July 1, 1984.

In the spring of 1998 the leadership of Mississippi Foundation For Medical Care voted to change the name to Information & Quality Healthcare in order to better meet the challenges of the 21st century.

IQH has worked in quality improvement under contract with Centers for Medicare & Medicaid Services (CMS) for over 40 years and provided tobacco cessation services since 1999. CMS has recently restructured the QIO program to a more regional structure with 14 entities known as Quality Innovation Networks (QIN-QIOs). IQH is a part of the newly formed atom Alliance. The alliance comprises Qsource (Indiana, Kentucky, and Tennessee); Information and Quality Healthcare, Mississippi; and Alabama Quality Assurance Foundation.

Charter
Signatures on the 1971 charter are those of Governor John Bell Williams and Secretary of State Heber Ladner for the state and Dr. J.T. Davis, Sr., M.D. of Corinth, MS, Dr. Everett Crawford of Tylertown, MS and Dr. James O. Gilmore of Oxford, MS as officers of the Mississippi State Medical Association. The charter describes the Foundation as "a nonprofit corporation" and as a "civic improvement corporation", governed by a board of directors, with each member having voting privileges.

Dr. Arthur A. Derrick Memorial Award recipients
The Arthur A. Derrick Award that is presented annually by IQH to recognize a physician’s outstanding efforts to the quality program was created in 1993 in memory of Dr. Derrick. The Durant, Mississippi physician is remembered for his special contributions to medicine in the state and as a long-time supporter of quality improvement and the organization’s work. The award emphasizes the importance of quality improvement.
 2013:  Edward E. Bryant
 2012:  Magdi Wassef
 2011:  William Jackson
 2010:  Rodney Frothingham
 2009:  Samuel Peeples
 2008:  Lee Greer
 2007:  Leonard Brandon
 2007:  Steven Brandon
 2006:  Steve Parvin
 2005:  Stanley Hartness
 2004:  Ken Davis
 2003:  Ralph Dunn
 2002:  Tom Mitchell
 2001:  Alton Cobb
 2000:  Candace Keller
 1999:  David Lee Gordon
 1998:  Jack Evans
 1997:  Glenn Peters
 1996:  George Abraham
 1995:  John Cook
 1994:  Richard Miller
 1993:  Tom Fenter

References

External links
 Official website
 Mississippi Coastal Health Information Exchange
 Official Tennessee Quitline website
 Official Mississippi Quitline website
 Success Stories: Mississippi, an article from The American Health Quality Association
 HIMSS Katrina Phoenix Project an article from Health Information and Management Systems
 IQH assists healthcare providers with move to EHR by Lynne W. Jeter - Published: June 27,2005 - Mississippi Business Journal
 Patient safety front and center for industry coalition by Lynn Lofton - Published: April 16,2007 - Mississippi Journal
 Campaign urges hospitals to go totally smoke-free this year by Lynn Lofton - Published: January 29,2007
 Hartness, Herrin join IQH team by MBJ Staff - Published: September 26,2010

Non-profit organizations based in Mississippi
Medical and health organizations based in Mississippi
Quality Improvement Organizations in Medicare
Healthcare in Mississippi
Madison County, Mississippi
Companies based in Mississippi
Smoking cessation
Organizations established in 1971
Hinds County, Mississippi
Jackson
1971 establishments in Mississippi